Anthony James Wingenter (born April 15, 1994) is an American professional baseball pitcher in the Detroit Tigers organization. He previously played in Major League Baseball (MLB) for the San Diego Padres.

Career

Amateur career
Wingenter attended Bob Jones High School in Madison, Alabama, and played for the school's baseball team. In 2012, his senior year, he had a 9–0 win–loss record with a 0.47 earned run average (ERA). He was drafted by the Seattle Mariners in the 36th round of the 2012 Major League Baseball draft, but did not sign and played college baseball at Auburn University. In 2014, he played collegiate summer baseball with the Cotuit Kettleers of the Cape Cod Baseball League. In 2015, his junior year, he pitched to a 1–6 record with a 4.28 ERA in 21 games. After his junior season, he was drafted by the San Diego Padres in the 17th round of the 2015 MLB draft.

Professional career
Wingenter made his professional debut with the Arizona League Padres and was later promoted to the Tri-City Dust Devils; in 12 combined games between both teams, he posted a 1–2 record with a 7.23 ERA. He pitched 2016 with the Fort Wayne TinCaps, Lake Elsinore Storm and San Antonio Missions, pitching to a 3–1 record, a 1.70 ERA and a 1.06 WHIP in 39 games, and 2017 with San Antonio where he went 2–1 with a 2.45 ERA with 64 strikeouts in 47.2 innings (49 games), earning Texas League All-Star honors.

Wingenter began the 2018 season with the El Paso Chihuahuas of the Class AAA Pacific Coast League. The Padres promoted him to the major leagues on August 5. In 2019, Wingenter appeared in 51 games, recording an ERA of 5.65 despite averaging 12.7 strikeouts per nine.

On July 17, 2020, Wingenter underwent Tommy John surgery and would miss the 2020 season. On February 18, 2021, Wingenter was placed on the 60-day injured list as he continued to recover from Tommy John surgery.

On November 30, 2021, Wingenter was non-tendered by the Padres, making him a free agent.

Cincinnati Reds
On December 1, 2021,  Wingenter signed a minor league contract with the Cincinnati Reds. On November 10, 2022, Wingenter elected free agency.

Detroit Tigers 
On January 15, 2023, Wingenter signed a minor league contract with the Detroit Tigers with an invitation to spring training camp.

References

External links

Auburn Tigers bio

1994 births
Living people
Sportspeople from Huntsville, Alabama
Baseball players from Alabama
Major League Baseball pitchers
San Diego Padres players
Auburn Tigers baseball players
Cotuit Kettleers players
Arizona League Padres players
Tri-City Dust Devils players
Fort Wayne TinCaps players
Lake Elsinore Storm players
San Antonio Missions players
Amarillo Sod Poodles players
El Paso Chihuahuas players